Jaworki may refer to the following villages in Poland:
Jaworki, Lesser Poland Voivodeship (southern Poland)
Jaworki, Podlaskie Voivodeship (north-east Poland)

Jaworki may refer to the following foods:
 Angel Wings, a Polish pastry